Same Old is a Canadian-American short drama film, directed by Lloyd Lee Choi and released in 2022. The film stars Limin Wang as Lu, a food delivery driver in New York City who, after his e-bike is stolen, must come to terms with the fragility of his life in America as he cannot afford to replace the bike in order to maintain his livelihood.

The film premiered in the short film competition at the 2022 Cannes Film Festival. It had its North American premiere at the 2022 Toronto International Film Festival, where it received an honorable mention from the Best Canadian Short Film jury.

The film was named to TIFF's annual year-end Canada's Top Ten list for 2022.

References

External links

2022 films
2022 short films
American drama short films
Canadian drama short films
2020s American films
2020s Canadian films
Films about Korean Americans
Films about Korean Canadians
Films set in New York City
Films shot in New York City